De Villiers Graaff High School is an academic state secondary school in Villiersdorp, a small town approximately 150 km from Cape Town, South Africa. It was founded in 1872 and is also known by the acronym "DVG".

History

Though officially established in 1872, Sir David de Villiers Graaff and his brother Jacobus, financed the construction of the High School in 1907 with the Dutch style buildings being designed by Cape Town architectural firm Parker and Forsyth. Together the Graaff brothers established a GB£100 000 (equivalent to £41,100,000 or R471,195,167 in 2010) endowment fund for the school.
Originally consisting of three boys boarding houses, Malherbe House, Graaff Hall and du Raan (which housed high as well as primary school children), and one girls boarding house, Theresa House (which also housed high and primary school girls), in the last 15–20 years only du Raan and Theresa remain operational.

Culture
The school offers a range of cultural and social activities and societies.

On a social level, annual activities include the Matric Ball, Mr and Ms DVG, a Valentine’s dinner social and the Oscadis review concert.
Culturally, the school offers Religious Youth Action, choir, first aid, drama, debate and the Representative Student Counsel.

Sports 
De Villiers Graaff has a proud sporting history beginning with inter school colour competitiveness and extending to rival schools like Hermanus, Caledon, Worcester and even as far as Bellville and Stellenbosch. With sports like Rugby, Netball, Hockey, Athletics, Cricket, Tennis and Swimming, the school has seen a few notable achievers pass through its doors.

Notable alumni
 Colin Eglin, politician

Gallery

External links
De Villiers Graaff High School homepage
140th Anniversary celebration

References

Mixed-sex education
Boarding schools in South Africa
Educational institutions established in 1872
1872 establishments in the Cape Colony